Boļeslavs Maikovskis (21 January 1904 – 19 April 1996) was a Latvian Nazi collaborator who served as chief of police for the second precinct of Rēzekne while the Germans occupied Latvia in World War II. After the war Maikovskis went to Austria before reaching the United States in 1951 where he served on a subcommittee of the Committee to Re-elect the President during Richard M. Nixon's 1972 campaign.

Maikovskis lied on his US visa application when asked whether he had "been complicit in the persecutions of others during World War II". That question was removed from the application the year after Maikovskis emigrated to the United States. Maikovskis lived in Mineola, New York, for 36 years, where he was active in Latvian organizations, and worked as a carpenter until his retirement. 

In 1965, Maikovskis was wanted for trial, and was tried and sentenced to death in absentia, in his former Latvia (by the then Soviet Union). His crimes were detailed in a late 1970s 60 Minutes Sunday show. Maikovskis was previously featured in the book Wanted: The Search for Nazis in America, by Howard Blum (1977 & 1989). The original publisher, Fawcett Books, was a CBS News affiliate.

The Soviet Union, which had no extradition treaty with the United States, demanded his extradition. The United States refused, but the Immigration and Naturalization Service started an investigation whose hearings, court actions and appeals lasted more than 20 years. During this time, Maikovskis became the target of anti-Nazi vigilantes. In August 1978, he was shot in the right knee at his home. In 1979, a man stabbed a person whom he mistook for Maikovskis. In September 1981, his home was bombed by the Jewish Defense League.

Maikovskis fled from the U.S. in 1987, after his deportation to the Soviet Union became a certainty. He settled in West Germany after secretly convincing a diplomatic official to grant him a visa. In October 1988, Maikovskis was arrested as a suspected war criminal. He was held in a prison hospital until the fall of 1992. Maikovskis was simultaneously prosecuted in the German judicial system, but the case was dropped on health grounds in 1994. He died in Münster in 1996, aged 92, from a heart attack.

See also
 Feodor Fedorenko
 John Demjanjuk
 Karl Linnas
 Algimantas Dailidė
 Anton Geiser
 Andrija Artuković
 Valerian Trifa

References

1904 births
1996 deaths
People from Rezhitsky Uyezd
Latvian collaborators with Nazi Germany
Latvian emigrants to the United States
Latvian expatriates in Germany
Holocaust perpetrators in Latvia
Nazis sentenced to death in absentia
People sentenced to death in absentia by the Soviet Union
Loss of United States citizenship by prior Nazi affiliation

Latvian prisoners and detainees
Shooting survivors
Prisoners and detainees of Germany